Kianya Haynes (born December 17, 1976) is an American actress who is best known for role as Keisha on the OWN/TBS comedy-drama television series Tyler Perry's For Better or Worse. She has also had roles in the films Bamboozled (2000), Nora's Hair Salon (2004) and Restraining Order (2006).

Career
Her first acting role was a small part in Spike Lee's Bamboozled (2000), which starred Damon Wayans and Jada Pinkett-Smith. She followed that with a small part in the 2004 comedy Nora's Hair Salon appearing alongside Jenifer Lewis and Tatyana Ali. Haynes' first break came in 2007 when she landed the lead role of Nicole Lawson in the stage play The Bachelorette Party by Donald Welch and in association with Will Smith. She gained other roles for different projects including Restraining Order (2006) and Double Duty (2009).

However, Kiki's big break came in 2011 after landing her starring role in Tyler Perry's For Better or Worse. Haynes plays Keisha Jones, single mother and ex-girlfriend to Marcus Williams (played by Michael Jai White). She is also newly wed to Richard Ellington, played by Kent Faulcon which causes quite a tension as Richard and Marcus are former college buddies and business partners.  On November 9, 2011, she was nominated for Supporting Actress in a comedy at the 43rd NAACP Image Awards.

Personal life
Kiki was born in Livingston, New Jersey, the daughter of Reginald Haynes, leader of the R&B singing group The Legendary Escorts, and Oona'o Haynes, a spoken word artist and founding member of the National Association of Black Journalists.

Kiki grew up in East Orange, New Jersey with her only sibling, Alethia Pierson. Her curiosity to seek a career as an actress began as a very young girl as she watched both her parents perform on stage. Once she joined the drama club at her middle school, Hart Middle, at the age of 10, she entered the drama competition and won the best actress award amongst 6th graders. That win awarded Kiki with a trip to visit the set of The Cosby Show, where she met Bill Cosby, Phylicia Rashad, Malcolm Jamal Warner and the rest of the cast. It was that monumental moment she realized she too one day would be on a set of her own, starring in a TV Show.

Filmography

Film

Television

References

External links
 

Living people
American television actresses
Actresses from New Jersey
Actors from East Orange, New Jersey
American film actresses
People from Livingston, New Jersey
African-American actresses
20th-century American actresses
21st-century American actresses
1976 births
20th-century African-American women
20th-century African-American people
21st-century African-American women
21st-century African-American people